Sali River (In Bengali 'শালি') is an important tributary of Damodar River that drains the northern part of Bankura district in the Indian state of West Bengal. It originates a few miles west of Kora hill, halfway between Mejia and Bankura, and joins the Damodar at Somsar village in Indas police station. It is a rain-fed river.

References

Rivers of West Bengal
Rivers of India